Antony John is the current  Member of Legislative Assembly (MLA) of Kothamangalam. He participated in 2016 Kerala assembly election representing Communist party and defeated T. U. Kuruvilla of United Democratic Front (UDF).

Party Politics

2021 Assembly Election

References

20th-century Indian politicians

Year of birth missing (living people)
Living people